Chervyakov (masculine) or Chervyakova (feminine) is a Russian surname.

This surname is shared by the following people:

Chervyakov 
 Aleksandr Chervyakov (born 1957), Azerbaijani volleyball coach
 Aleksey Chervyakov (born 1984), Azerbaijani male volleyball player
 Alexander Chervyakov (1892–1937), one of the founders and eventually became the leader of the Communist Party of Belorussia
 Alexandr Chervyakov (born 1980), Kazakh biathlete
 Denis Chervyakov (born 1970), Russian ice hockey defenceman
 Sergey Chervyakov (born 1959), Soviet Nordic combined skier

Russian-language surnames